The women's pole vault event at the 2002 World Junior Championships in Athletics was held in Kingston, Jamaica, at National Stadium on 16 and 18 July.

Medalists

Results

Final
18 July

Qualifications
16 Jul

Group A

Group B

Participation
According to an unofficial count, 23 athletes from 17 countries participated in the event.

References

Pole vault
Pole vault at the World Athletics U20 Championships